

Overview and History

The Instructional Skills Workshop (ISW) is offered within a small group setting (5-6 participants) and is designed to enhance the teaching effectiveness of both new and experienced educators. It is a structured approach to peer feedback on microteaching with additional thematic sessions for instructors' learning. During the 24-hour workshop (usually offered over 3-4 days), participants design and conduct three "mini-lessons" and receive verbal, written and video feedback from the other participants who have been learners in the mini-lessons. Using an intensive experiential learning approach, the workshop encourages reflection and examination of one's teaching practices with feedback focused on the learning process rather than on the content of the lesson.

Those who wish to facilitate ISW after taking it must take the 40-hour Facilitator Development Workshop (FDW), and those who wish to train facilitators take the Trainer Development Workshop (TDW) by shadowing the FDW with a trainer from the network. 

The ISW promotes participatory learning and the building of community. Detailed information about the ISW and related workshops can be found at the ISW Network website

The Instructional Skills Workshop was initially designed for instructors at community colleges and institutes in British Columbia in 1978 by Douglas Kerr, from the Vancouver Community College at the request of Diane Morrison from the Ministry of Advanced Education.

In 1992, the University of British Columbia introduced the ISW as a program designed for teaching assistants.

The first handbook was written by Douglas Kerr in 1978. As the ISW grew across Canada and internationally, there have been numerous collaborators contributing to the handbook.

External links
 Instructional Skills Workshop Network http://iswnetwork.ca
 British Columbia Ministry of Advanced Education, Innovation and Technology and Responsible for Multiculturalism (formerly the Ministry of Advanced Education) http://www.gov.bc.ca/aeit/
 International Society for Scholarship of Teaching and Learning http://www.issotl.org/

References

Teacher training